The London Grid for Learning (LGfL) provides a filtered broadband connection, network services, a common learning platform, online content and support communities for all schools across London. It operates as a consortium of 33 local education authorities (LEAs). It was launched in June 2000, and provides broadband connectivity to most of the 2,600 state schools in London.

LGfL's initial purpose was to leverage purchasing power in the provision of broadband and related digital services for all member schools. By aggregating the procurement of infrastructure, e-learning platforms and educational content, London education authorities had by 2010 accrued savings in excess of £390m, compared to the cost of securing those services individually.

The London Grid for Learning was, along with twelve other regional grid bodies across the country, one of the founder members of the UK government's National Education Network (NEN). The network aimed to provide schools and libraries with high-speed connectivity, online learning platforms and access to a range of online educational content. Other NEN grid bodies include the West Midlands Regional Broadband Consortium (WMnet) and the East of England Regional Broadband Network.

History 
The London Grid for Learning was one of the eight consortia set up by local education authorities in 2000 to develop broadband access for schools, spawned from the government's National Grid for Learning. It was part of the government's Broadband in Schools Programme, a five-year project with the aim of providing every school with broadband by 2006.

A ten-year contract to supply broadband connection to all schools worth £40m was awarded to Equinox Converged Solutions. To fund the project, Chief Executive Brian Durrant announced that surplus bandwidth would be sold off to other organisations, including non-educational ones.

In April 2001, LGfL created a special purpose entity named the London Grid for Learning Trust with the purpose of enabling LEAs to act jointly in the procurement of services and letting of contracts.

The project was officially unveiled in an event hosted by Digitalbrain PLC, LGFL's portal partner, at London's IMAX cinema in June 2001, and the network went live for the first 350 schools on 1 September 2001. At the time it was the fourth largest metropolitan area network in the world.

Dennis Stevenson, who had outlined a vision the use of IT in schools in his 1997 report 'Connecting the Learning Society', described the launch of the LGfL as a 'defining moment' in realising that dream.

The initial strategic goal of LGfL of connecting every member school was achieved in 2005, thus fully meeting Tony Blair's challenge of 'every school on broadband' a year early.

In January 2011, following the end of the ten-year broadband deal with Equinox, LGfL signed a contract with Virgin Media. In 2014, LGfL extended its deal with Virgin for £1 billion, with the new contract expected to run until 2028.

Objectives 
As outlined in the 2013 Financial Statements, LGfL's objectives, which have all been achieved as of 2014, were the following:
 Broadband in all London schools.
 A secure personal digital learning platform available for every pupil.
 A wide range of high quality digital learning materials available free of charge to every pupil for use at school or at home.
 Secure fast internet access for every London school, with protection from viruses, spam email and inappropriate internet content.

Services

Broadband connection 

The original network laid in 2000 across the 2,600 schools, colleges and libraries was designed and delivered by Equinox Converged Solutions.

Instead of a distributed 'star' system of connections, Equinox proposed the use of two central 'core' locations and a series of nodal loops – running across a combination of 100Mbit/s and 1Gbit/s devices – providing broadband access at every connection point. It used dual 9.6Gbit/s Ethernet fibre connections between hubs in Park Royal and Earl's Court.

A third 'core' was set up in London's Docklands area to provide a local switching point for the eastern LEAs. Ten million metres of fibreoptic cable were laid to create the core rings of the network.

In 2011, the contract with Equinox ended and LGfL agreed a deal with Virgin Media. Virgin replaced the old legacy network with a 40Gbit/s network. The new deal reduced the cost of a 100Mbit/s connection to just a third of the former price tag.

Controversy over contracts 
On 31 March 2011, after the ten-year contract with the 2,600 schools ended, institutions were expected to negotiate IT contracts individually. This opened the possibility for schools to switch to a more affordable provider, though the great majority of them renewed their contract with LGfL.

On 27 October 2015 it was revealed that LGfL had been blocking emails from a competitor firm providing broadband contracts, Exa Networks. Mark Cowgill, Exa's Chief Executive, submitted a formal complaint to the Competition and Markets Authority alleging that the block amounted to 'anti-competitive' practices, and also claimed to have evidence that unfair pressure had been applied to schools to quickly renew their broadband deals with LGfL. Cowgill later added that the block had been causing schools to overspend as much as £50m, as his firm provides similar services to LGfL's for less than half of the cost.

However, some school heads supported LGfL, maintaining that London Grid offers a service that is technically superior to that promised by rivals.

Safeguarding and security

Cyber-bullying prevention 
In October 2007, LGfL rolled out software to tackle cyber-bullying across all London schools it connected. The software monitored computer activity on the internet, instant messaging, e-mail and other applications for inappropriate behaviour. If improper activity was detected, the programme stored details of the offending material for review.

Online filtering 
LGfL provides intelligent web-filtering technology for its 2,600 schools, which enables administrators and management to protect pupils from objectional content whilst monitoring and regulating internet usage throughout the schools. The filtering service is provided by NetSweeper Inc., whose Enterprise Filtering solution was chosen by broadband provider Equinox in 2002 because of its scalability, ease of use and administration capabilities. The contract was renewed in August 2005 for a further three years.

Besides blocking inappropriate web content, schools use NetSweeper as a productivity tool to restrict access to non-work related sites, which consequently reduces legal liabilities.

Spam protection 
A project to filter e-mail travelling across the LGfL network was initiated in August 2004, following revelations that 75% of the messages sent to school children through its network were spam. Half of those were selling drugs, and a further 20% of the spam was pornographic. After implementation of the filter, 98.2% of junk messages were blocked.

Identity management and authentication 
In 2006, LGfL developed a Unified Sign-On (USO) system to provide schools with a cross-domain single log-in system to access disparate educational content from diverse institutions and providers. The solution, developed on open-source authentication system Shibboleth, allowed users to access any online learning content, regardless of the server it was stored in or the provider sourcing it, using a single username and password. The project won the Computing Awards for Excellence 2006 "Public Sector Project of the Year" award.

Counter-extremism 
In May 2015, LGfL upgraded its email filtering system in response to school staff concerns about radicalisation, building a system that checks emails for grooming and radicalisation signs and allows suitable staff to access flagged messages so that appropriate interventions can be made.  In June 2015, LGfL released a series of videos in partnership with anti-extremism charity Inspire with the aim of challenging Islamist extremism as well as anti-Muslim beliefs, by exploring topics such as the narrative used by Isis, messages in Islam that oppose it, and the role played by social media in radicalisation.

London Schools Admissions Service 
In July 2006, the computerised Pan London Co-ordinated Schools Admissions Scheme, which helped thousands of parents and pupils find the secondary school of their choice, was merged with the online London e-Admissions Project to form the new London Schools Admissions Service within the London Grid for Learning. The new online admissions service for both secondary and primary school pupils allowed parents to apply online, increasing peace of mind as an instant email confirmation was sent upon receiving an application, and minimising the possibility of an error as information provided was quickly validated.

Managed learning environment 
An MLE network was set up in June 2001, enabling more than a million pupils to do their schoolwork from anywhere. It was the result of a public-private partnership between LGfL and Digitalbrain, an online education platform. At the time, the portal was said to be the most extensive learning network in the world with collaboration and interaction between students, teachers and parents throughout the capital.

As of 2015, there are over 100 resource libraries available to pupils, such as the entire Guardian and Observer newspaper archives, the British Pathé News film library, and over 50,000 professionally recorded music tracks. The learning platform can be accessed from a computer, at school or at home, thus creating learning opportunities outside the classroom.

Online polling 
The LGfL offers all London schools an online polling resource, which schools can use to nominate students and carry out elections for their year councils. The results are instantly available after voting takes place.

Computer access for deprived communities 
In October 2007, LGfL began rolling out a project to provide more than 10,000 computers, chiefly wireless-enabled laptops, to poorer children in London, as part of a two-year £60m Government initiative to provide computers for children in the poorest 10 per cent of households.

Videoconferencing 
In January 2010, LGfL set up the Videoconferencing Development Group (VDG) with the aim to 'enhance learning attainment and the development of key skills by promoting and facilitating the creative and effective use of videoconferencing'. The group's functions were to offer guidance and support to local authorities to promote videoconferencing, with resources such as examples of good practice, a guide to usage, instructional videos and case studies.

Governance 
The Trust is a charitable company limited by guarantee, and all 33 London Councils collectively own and share in its governance. The executive board of trustees is composed of representative directors of children's services and local authority officers responsible for the implementation of ICT in schools.

Local authorities are closely engaged in the work of the LGfL through regular meetings attended by representatives from all member authorities. The various decisions and activities undertaken by the Trust are guided by the work of nine groups made up of representatives from the LEAs, most notably the executive, editorial and E-safety board, and the technical steering group.

The day-to-day operation of the company is the responsibility of the Chief Executive who is accountable to the executive board and other boards.

The inaugural Chief Executive of LGfL is Brian Durrant, who in July 2015 announced he would retire the following year.

See also
 Regional Broadband Consortium
 East of England Broadband Consortium
 WMnet
 National Grid for Learning
 C2k
 East of England Broadband Network
 Glow (Scottish Schools National Intranet)
 Hwb (Digital Learning for Wales)

References

External links
 London Grid for Learning
 Pan London Admissions project
 London Public Services Network

Educational technology academic and professional associations
Education in London
Governmental educational technology organizations
Information technology organisations based in the United Kingdom